Aleksandar Atanacković may refer to:
Aleksandar Atanacković (footballer born 1920) (1920–2005), Serbian footballer
Aleksandar Atanacković (footballer born 1980), Serbian footballer